2017 Futsal Thai League (also known as AIS Futsal Thai League for sponsorship reasons) is top-tier professional futsal league under the Football Association of Thailand (FAT) and Advanced Info Service (AIS)'s control. This is the ninth edition of the league. A total of 14 teams join the league. The league is going to begin in March, 2017.

Teams 
Promoted teams

Sisaket and Thakham Cold Storage were promote from 2016 Thai Division 1 Futsal League

Relegated teams

Northeastern University - Khonkaen and CAT Telecom were relegated from 2016 Futsal Thailand League

League table

Results 
Results of the 2017 Futsal Thailand League.

References 

Futsal Thailand League official website 
Thai futsal official page on Facebook 

Futsal Thailand League